Maksim Kravtsov (born 20 June 2002) is a Belarusian professional footballer who plays for Neman Grodno.

References

External links 
 
 

2002 births
Living people
Belarusian footballers
Association football forwards
FC Neman Grodno players
FC Smorgon players